Dichomeris pleuroleuca is a moth in the family Gelechiidae. It was described by Turner in 1919. It is found in Australia, where it has been recorded from Queensland.

The forewings are fuscous with a broad ochreous-whitish the costal streak from the base nearly to the apex, narrowing posteriorly, with a small angular projection on the lower edge at one-thirds. The hindwings are grey-whitish.

References

Moths described in 1919
pleuroleuca